Enneacampus ansorgii, the African freshwater pipefish, is a pipefish in the family Syngnathidae (pipefishes and seahorses). It is widely distributed in coastal rivers and streams of Western Africa, being found in both slow and fast flowing water from the Gambia River to the Cuanza River in Angola. It is most likely that the specific name honours the explorer William John Ansorge (1850-1913).

References

Syngnathidae
Taxa named by George Albert Boulenger
Fish described in 1910